The Kansas Jayhawks football statistical leaders are individual statistical leaders of the Kansas Jayhawks football program in various categories, including passing, rushing, receiving, total offense, defensive stats, and kicking. Within those areas, the lists identify single-game, single-season, and career leaders. The Jayhawks represent the University of Kansas in the NCAA's Big 12 Conference.

Although Kansas began competing in intercollegiate football in 1890, the school's official record book considers the "modern era" to have begun in 1937. Records from before this year are often incomplete and inconsistent, and they are generally not included in these lists.

These lists are dominated by more recent players for several reasons:
 Since 1937, seasons have increased from 10 games to 11 and then 12 games in length.
 The NCAA didn't allow freshmen to play varsity football until 1972 (with the exception of the World War II years), allowing players to have four-year careers.
 Bowl games only began counting toward single-season and career statistics in 2002. The Jayhawks have played in four bowl games since then, allowing players in those seasons an extra game to accumulate statistics.
 The Jayhawks eclipsed 5,000 total yards in a season four times, under head coach Mark Mangino, who served from 2002 to 2009, allowing players from this era to rack up yards and touchdowns and make their way up these lists. Additionally, rule changes have allowed for offenses to be more productive than in the past.

These lists are updated through the 2022 season.

Passing

Passing yards

Passing touchdowns

Rushing

Rushing yards

Rushing touchdowns

Receiving

Receptions

Receiving yards

Receiving touchdowns

Total offense
Total offense is the sum of passing and rushing statistics. It does not include receiving or returns.

Total offense yards

Total touchdowns

Defense

Interceptions

Tackles

Sacks

Kicking
The 2014 Kansas Football Media Guide does not list a full top 10 in field goal kicking stats.

Field goals made

Field goal percentage

References

Kansas